The 2011 Sun Devils football team represented Arizona State University in the 2011 NCAA Division I FBS football season. The team was coached by fifth year head coach Dennis Erickson and played their home games in Sun Devil Stadium in Tempe, Arizona. They are a member of the South Division of the Pac-12 Conference. They finished the season 6–7, 4–5 in Pac-12 play to finish in a tie for third place in the South Division. They were invited to the Maaco Bowl Las Vegas where they were defeated by Boise State.

At the end of the regular season, head coach Dennis Erickson was fired. He stayed on to coach in the Sun Devils bowl game and finished with a five-year record of 31–31.

Schedule

Game summaries

UC Davis

The Sun Devils played the UC Davis Aggies on September 1 and won 48–14. Quarterback Brock Osweiler threw two touchdown passes – both of them to receiver Aaron Pflugrad – and finished with 19 completions on 26 attempts before leaving with leg cramps in the third quarter. Running back Cameron Marshall added two rushing touchdowns as the Sun Devils amassed 217 yards on the ground. ASU's defense managed to keep the Aggies scoreless until the fourth quarter; the Aggies scored both touchdowns against ASU's reserves.

Missouri
Jamal Miles caught an 11-yard touchdown pass from Brock Osweiler in overtime, then the defense held Missouri out of the end zone on their possession to seal Arizona State's wild win over No. 21 Missouri, 37 - 30.  The win was Dennis Erickson's 28th career victory over a ranked opponent.

Illinois

USC

    
    
    
    
    
    
    
    
    
    
    

USC had won the last 11 meetings, with Arizona State last defeating USC in 1999.  In this game, USC led 22–21 in the third quarter, but Arizona State then scored 22 unanswered points to win 43–22.

Oregon State

Utah

Oregon

Colorado

UCLA

First Quarter scoring: UCLA – Johnathan Franklin 11-yard run (Tyler Gonzalez kick failed); ASU – A.J. Pickens 35-yard pass from Brock Osweiler (Alex Garoutte kick)
 
Second Quarter scoring: 	ASU – C. Marshall 14-yard run (Garoutte kick); UCLA – Gonzalez 43-yard field goal; UCLA – Derrick Coleman 1-yard run (Gonzalez kick) 
  	  	  	
Third Quarter scoring: UCLA – Nelson Rosario 76-yard pass from Kevin Prince (Gonzalez kick); ASU – Jamal Miles, 9-yard pass from Brock Osweiler (Garoutte kick)

Fourth Quarter scoring: ASU – Osweiler 1-yard run (Garoutte kick); UCLA – Coleman 1-yard run (Prince pass failed)

Washington State

Arizona

California

Boise State–Maaco Bowl Las Vegas

Rankings

References

Arizona State
Arizona State Sun Devils football seasons
Arizona State Sun Devils football